Michael S. Kellogg (born September 27, 1941) is an American radio announcer and personality. He was known as the senior announcer with Moody Radio and host for Music Thru The Night until his retirement in 2014.

Early life
Kellogg was born in Detroit, Michigan on September 26, 1941. He was later educated at Cedarville College in Cedarville, Ohio. Kellogg moved to Valparaiso, Indiana.

Career
Kellogg first wanted to be a writer who later got a job for a newspaper company at a young age, and was later writing for the broadcasting company in Chicago.

In late 1982 Kellogg was hired to be host of Music Thru the Night. Kellogg spoke to the late-night listener, presenting a relaxed yet direct message of the fullness of a life with Christ. In Music Thru the Night, Kellogg was heard in a two-minute radio program Today in the Word and in the audio of the New Living Translation (NLT) of the Bible accessible through the application YouVersion. His voice is characterized by a poetic and dramatic tone and the audio includes occasional musical background.

Kellogg officially retired in May 2014.

Personal life
He has been married to Nancy Smith since 1965 with whom he has six children and ten grandchildren. Kellogg currently lives in Valparaiso, Indiana. Kellogg is an educator of New Testament theology.

Honors
In February 2015, Kellogg was inducted to the National Religious Broadcasters Hall of Fame.

References

External links
 
 

Writers from Chicago
Writers from Ohio
American radio personalities
1941 births
Living people
People from Cedarville, Ohio